Conus laterculatus is a species of sea snail, a marine gastropod mollusk in the family Conidae, the cone snails and their allies.

Like all species with the superfamily Conoidea, these snails are predatory and venomous. They are capable of "stinging" humans; therefore, live ones should be handled carefully or not at all.

Description
The size of an adult shell varies between 33 mm and 64 mm.

The shell is distantly channeled throughout, the interstices usually plane, sometimes minutely granular. The channels are narrow, longitudinally striated. The spire is much elevated, acuminated, striate, sometimes obscurely minutely coronated. The color of the shell is yellowish brown, with light chestnut longitudinal short irregular lines, and clouds of the same color forming three obscure interrupted bands.

Distribution
This marine species is found off the Philippines, Borneo and Vietnam.

References

 Sowerby, G.B. Jr. (1870). Descriptions of Forty-eight new Species of Shells. Proc. Zool. Soc. Lond. (1870): 249–259
 Filmer R.M. (2001). A Catalogue of Nomenclature and Taxonomy in the Living Conidae 1758 – 1998. Backhuys Publishers, Leiden. 388pp
 Tucker J.K. (2009). Recent cone species database. September 4, 2009 Edition
 Tucker J.K. & Tenorio M.J. (2009) Systematic classification of Recent and fossil conoidean gastropods. Hackenheim: Conchbooks. 296 pp
 Puillandre N., Duda T.F., Meyer C., Olivera B.M. & Bouchet P. (2015). One, four or 100 genera? A new classification of the cone snails. Journal of Molluscan Studies. 81: 1–23

External links
 The Conus Biodiversity website
 
 Cone Shells – Knights of the Sea

Molluscs described in 1870